Grand Chess Tour 2021 – was a series of chess tournaments, which was sixth edition of Grand Chess Tour. It consisted five tournaments, including two tournaments with classical time control and three tournaments with faster time controls. It was won by American grandmaster Wesley So.

Format 
Tour consists five tournaments, two classicals and three rapid & blitz, respectively. Rapid & Blitz tournaments consisted two parts – rapid (2 points for win, 1 for draw) and blitz (1 point for win, 0.5 for draw). Combined result for both portions was counted in overall standings.
The tour points are awarded as follows:
{| class="wikitable" style="text-align:center;"
! Place !! Points
|-
| 1st || 12/13*
|-
| 2nd || 10
|-
| 3rd || 8
|-
| 4th || 7
|-
|  5th || 6
|-
|  6th || 5
|-
|  7th || 4
|-
| 8th || 3
|-
|  9th || 2
|-
| 10th || 1
|}

 If a player wins 1st place outright (without the need for a playoff), they are awarded 13 points instead of 12.
 Tour points are shared equally between tied players.

Schedule

Results

Tournaments

Superbet Chess Classic 
First leg of the Grand Chess Tour was held in Bucharest, Romania in 3–15 June, 2021. It was won by Shakhriyar Mamedyarov from Azerbaijan.
{| class="wikitable" style="text-align:center;"
|+ Superbet Chess Classic, 3-15 June Bucharest, Romania, Category XXI (2750.5)
! !! Player !! Rating !! 1 !! 2 !! 3 !! 4 !! 5 !! 6 !! 7 !! 8 !! 9 !! 10 !! Points !!  !!  !! SB !! Koya !! TPR !! Tour Points
|-
|-style="background:#ccffcc;"
| 1 || align=left |  || 2770 ||   || 1 || ½ || ½ || ½ || ½ || ½ || 1 || 1 || ½ || 6 || || || || || 2882 || 13
|-
| 2 || align=left |  || 2781 || 0 ||  || ½ || 1 || ½ || ½ || 1 || ½ || ½ || ½ || 5 || 1½ || || || || 2791 || 8.3
|-
| 3 || align=left |  || 2770 || ½ || ½ ||  || ½ || ½ || ½ || ½ || 1 || ½ || ½ || 5 || 1 || |||| || 2793 || 8.3
|-
| 4 || align=left |  || 2776 || ½ || 0 || ½ ||   || ½ || ½ || 1 || ½ || 1 || ½ || 5 || ½ ||  || || || 2792 || 8.3
|-
| 5 || align=left |  || 2780 || ½ || ½ || ½ || ½ ||  || ½ || ½ || ½ || 0 || 1 || 4½ || ½ || 1 || || || 2747 || 5.5
|-
| 6 || align=left |  || 2765 || ½ || ½ || ½ || ½ || ½ ||   || ½ || ½ || ½ || ½ || 4½ || ½ || 0 || || || 2749 || 5.5
|-
| 7 || align=left |  || 2627 || ½ || 0 || ½ || 0 || ½ || ½ ||  || ½ || ½ || 1 || 4 || ½ || 1 || 17.25 || || 2720 || 3.5
|-
| 8 || align=left |  || 2820 || 0 || ½ || 0 || ½ || ½ || ½ || ½ ||  || 1 || ½ || 4 || ½ || 1 || 16.75 || || 2698 || 3.5
|-
| 9 || align=left |  || 2656 || 0 || ½ || ½ || 0 || 1 || ½ || ½ || 0 ||  || ½ || 3½ || ½ || 1 || || || 2672 || 1.5
|-
| 10 || align=left |  || 2760 || ½ || ½ || ½ || ½ || 0 || ½ || 0 || ½ || ½ ||  || 3½ || ½ || 0 || || || 2660 || 1.5
|}

Paris Rapid & Blitz 
Second leg of the 2021 Grand Chess Tour was won by Wesley So.
{| class="wikitable" style="text-align: center;"
|+Paris Grand Chess Tour Rapid, 20–22 June 2021, Paris, France
! !! Player !! Rating !! 1 !! 2 !! 3 !! 4 !! 5 !! 6 !! 7 !! 8 !! 9 !! 10 !! Points !!  !!  !! SB
|-
|-style="background:#ccffcc;"
| 1 || align=left| || 2741 || || ½ || ½ || ½ || 1 || ½ || 1 || ½ || 1 || ½ || 6 || || ||
|-
| 2 || align="left" | || 2778 || ½ ||  || 1 || ½ || 0 || 1 || ½ || 1 || ½ || ½ || 5½ || || ||
|-
| 3 || align="left" | || 2667 || ½ || 0 ||  || ½ || 1 || 0 || 1 || ½ || 1 || ½ || 5 || || ||
|-
| 4 || align="left" | || 2742 || ½ || ½ || ½ ||  || 1 || 1 || 0 || ½ || 0 || ½ || 4½ || 1 || ||
|-
| 5 || align="left" | || 2860 || 0 || 1 || 0 || 0 ||  || ½ || ½ || 1 || ½ || 1 || 4½ || 0 || ||
|-
| 6 || align="left" | || 2778 || ½ || 0 || 1 || 0 || ½ ||  || ½ || ½ || ½ || ½ || 4 || 1½ || 1 || 18.00
|-
| 7 || align="left" | || 2773 || 0 || ½ || 0 || 1 || ½ || ½ ||  || ½ || ½ || ½ || 4 || 1½ || 1 || 17.25
|-
| 8 || align="left" | || 2758 || ½ || 0 || ½ || ½ || 0 || ½ || ½ ||  || ½ || 1 || 4 || 1½  || 1 || 17.25
|-
| 9 || align="left" | || 2727 || 0 || ½ || 0 || 1 || ½ || ½ || ½ || ½ ||  || ½ || 4 || 1½ || 1 || 17.25
|-
| 10 || align="left" | || 2703 || ½ || ½ || ½ || ½ || 0 || ½ || ½ || 0 || ½ ||  || 3½ || || ||
|}

{| class="wikitable" style="text-align: center;"
|+Paris Grand Chess Tour Blitz, 23–24 June 2021, Paris, France
! !! Player !! Rating !! 1 !! 2 !! 3 !! 4 !! 5 !! 6 !! 7 !! 8 !! 9 !! 10 !! Points !!  !!  !! SB
|-
|-style="background:#ccffcc;"
| 1 || align=left| || 2816 || || 1 1 || ½ 1 || 0 1 || ½ ½ || 1 1 || ½ ½ || ½ ½ || 1 ½ || ½ 1 || 12½ || || ||
|-
| 2 || align="left" | || 2770 || 0 0 ||  || 1 1 || 1 ½ || 1 0 || 1 0 || 0 0 || ½ 1 || 1 1 || 1 1 || 11 || ||||
|-
| 3 || align="left" | || 2785 || ½ 0 || 0 0 ||  || 1 ½ || ½ ½ || ½ 1 || 1 ½ || ½ 1 || 1 ½ || 1 ½ || 10½ || || ||
|-
| 4 || align="left" | || 2739 || 1 0 || 0 ½ || 0 ½ ||  || ½ 1 || 0 1 || ½ ½ || 1 ½ || 1 0 || ½ 1 || 9½ || 1½ || ||
|-
| 5 || align="left" | || 2759 || ½ ½ || 0 1 || ½ ½ || ½ 0 ||  || ½ ½ || ½ 1 || 0 ½ || ½ 1 || 1 ½ || 9½ || ½ || ||
|-
| 6 || align="left" | || 2822 || 0 0 || 0 1 || ½ 0 || 1 0 || ½ ½ ||  || 1 ½ || 0 ½ || ½ 1 || 1 1 || 9 || || ||
|-
| 7 || align="left" | || 2711 || ½ ½ || 1 1 || 0 ½ || ½ ½ || ½ 0 || 0 ½ ||  || ½ 1 || 0 1 || ½ 0 || 8½ || || ||
|-
| 8 || align="left" | || 2754 || ½ ½ || ½ 0 || ½ 0 || 0 ½ || 1 ½ || 1 ½ || ½ 0 ||  || 1 0 || 0 1 || 8 ||  || ||
|-
| 9 || align="left" | || 2757 || 0 ½ || 0 0 || 0 ½ || 0 1 || ½ 0 || ½ 0 || 1 0 || 0 1 ||  || 1 0 || 6 || || ||
|-
| 10 || align="left" | || 2797 || ½ 0 || 0 0 || 0 ½ || ½ 0 || 0 ½ || 0 0 || ½ 1 || 1 0 || 0 1 ||  || 5½ || || ||
|}

Final standings
{| class="wikitable" style="text-align: center;"
! !! Player !! Points(rapid score doubled)
|-
|-style="background:#ccffcc;"
| 1 || align=left| || 24½
|-
| 2 || align="left" | || 21½
|-
| T-3 || align="left" | || 18
|-
| T-3 || align="left" | || 18
|-
| T-5 || align="left" | || 17½
|-
| T-5 || align="left" | || 17½
|-
| 7 || align="left" | || 17
|-
| 8 || align="left" | || 16½
|-
| 9 || align="left" | || 15½
|-
| 10 || align="left" | || 14
|}

Croatia Rapid & Blitz 
Third leg of the Grand Chess Tour was held in Zagreb, Croatia in 7-11 July, 2021. It had a lot of attention from media because of participation of former World Chess Champion Garry Kasparov.  The event was won by French grandmaster Maxime Vachier-Lagrave.
{| class="wikitable" style="text-align: center;"
|+Croatia Grand Chess Tour Rapid, 7–9 July 2021, Zagreb, Croatia
! !! Player !! Rating !! 1 !! 2 !! 3 !! 4 !! 5 !! 6 !! 7 !! 8 !! 9 !! 10 !! Points !!  !!  !! SB
|-
|-style="background:#ccffcc;"
| 1 || align=left| || 2791 || || 0 || ½ || ½ || ½ || 1 || ½ || 1 || 1 || ½ || 5½ || || ||
|-
| 2 || align="left" | || 2650 || 1 ||  || ½ || ½ || 1 || ½ || ½ || ½ || 0 || ½ || 5 || 2 || 2 || 23.50
|-
| 3 || align="left" | || 2831 || ½ || ½ ||  || 1 || ½ || 0 || 1 || ½ || ½ || ½ || 5 || 2 || 2 || 22.50
|-
| 4 || align="left" | || 2774 || ½ || ½ || 0 ||  || ½ || 1 || ½ || ½ || 1 || ½ || 5 || 1 || 2 || 21.50
|-
| 5 || align="left" | || 2731 || ½ || 0 || ½ || ½ ||  || ½ || 1 || ½ || 1 || ½ || 5 || 1 || 2 || 21.50
|-
| 6 || align="left" | || 2761 || 0 || ½ || 1 || 0 || ½ ||  || ½ || ½ || ½ || 1 || 4½ || ½ || 2 || 19.50
|-
| 7 || align="left" | || 2753 || ½ || ½ || 0 || ½ || 0 || ½ ||  || ½ || 1 || 1 || 4½ || ½ || 2 || 18.50
|-
| 8 || align="left" | || 2784 || 0 || ½ || ½ || ½ || ½ || ½ || ½ ||  || ½ || ½ || 4 ||  || ||
|-
| 9 || align="left" | || 2781 || 0 || 1 || ½ || 0 || 0 || ½ || 0 || ½ ||  || 1 || 3½ ||  || ||
|-
| 10 || align="left" | || 2543 || ½ || ½ || ½ || ½ || ½ || 0 || 0 || ½ || 0 ||  || 3 || || ||
|}

{| class="wikitable" style="text-align: center;"
|+Croatia Grand Chess Tour Blitz, 10–11 July 2021, Paris, France
! !! Player !! Rating !! 1 !! 2 !! 3 !! 4 !! 5 !! 6 !! 7 !! 8 !! 9 !! 10 !! Points !!  !!  !! SB
|-
|-style="background:#ccffcc;"
| 1 || align=left| || 2794 || || ½ ½ || 0 1 || 1 ½ || 1 ½ || ½ 1 || 1 ½ || ½ 1 || 1 ½ || 1 1 || 13 || || ||
|-
| 2 || align="left" | || 2785 || ½ ½ ||  || 0 ½ || ½ ½ || ½ ½ || 1 ½ || 0 1 || 1 1 || 1 1 || 1 1 || 12 || ||||
|-
| 3 || align="left" | || 2744 || 1 0 || 1 ½ ||  || ½ ½ || ½ 1 || ½ 0 || ½ 1 || 0 1 || ½ ½ || 1 ½ || 10½ || || ||
|-
| 4 || align="left" | || 2765 || 0 ½ || ½ ½ || ½ ½ ||  || 1 0 || ½ 1 || ½ ½ || 1 0 || ½ 1 || ½ 1 || 10 || 2½ || ||
|-
| 5 || align="left" | || 2716 || 0 ½ || ½ ½ || ½ 0 || 0 1 ||  || 0 1 || 1 1 || 0 0 || 1 1 || 1 1 || 10 || 2 || ||
|-
| 6 || align="left" | || 2799 || ½ 0 || 0 ½ || ½ 1 || ½ 0 || 1 0 ||  || 0 1 || 1 1 || 0 1 || 1 1 || 10 || 1½ || ||
|-
| 7 || align="left" | || 2807 || 0 ½ || 1 0 || ½ 0 || ½ ½ || 0 0 || 1 0 ||  || 1 1 || 1 ½ || 1 ½ || 9 || || ||
|-
| 8 || align="left" | || 2668 || ½ 0 || 0 0 || 1 0 || 0 1 || 1 1 || 0 0 || 0 0 ||  || 1 1 || 1 1 || 8½ ||  || ||
|-
| 9 || align="left" | || 2622 || 0 ½ || 0 0 || ½ ½ || ½ 0 || 0 0 || 1 0 || 0 ½ || 0 0 ||  || 1 0 || 4½ || || ||
|-
| 10 || align="left" | || 2801 || 0 0 || 0 0 || 0 ½ || ½ 0 || 0 0 || 0 0 || 0 ½ || 0 0 || 0 1 ||  || 2½ || || ||
|}

Final standings
{| class="wikitable" style="text-align: center;"
! !! Player !! Points(rapid score doubled)
|-
|-style="background:#ccffcc;"
| 1 || align="left" | || 23
|-
| 2 || align="left" | || 21
|-
| 3 || align="left" | || 20½
|-
| T-4 || align="left" | || 20
|-
| T-4 || align="left" | || 20
|-
| 6 || align="left" | || 19
|-
| 7 || align="left" | || 18
|-
| 8 || align="left" | || 15½
|-
| 9 || align="left" | || 12½
|-
| 10 || align="left" | || 10½
|}

Saint Louis Rapid & Blitz 
{| class="wikitable" style="text-align: center;"
|+Saint Louis Grand Chess Tour Rapid, 12–14 August 2021, St. Louis, Missouri, United States
! !! Player !! Rating !! 1 !! 2 !! 3 !! 4 !! 5 !! 6 !! 7 !! 8 !! 9 !! 10 !! Points !!  !!  !! SB
|-
|-style="background:#ccffcc;"
| 1 || align=left| || 2829 || || ½ || 1 || ½ || 1 || ½ || ½ || ½ || 1 || ½ || 6 || || ||
|-
| 2 || align="left" | || 2724 || ½ ||  || 1 || ½ || ½ || 1 || ½ || 1 || 0 || ½ || 5½ || 1 || ||
|-
| 3 || align="left" | || 2758 || 0 || 0 ||  || 1 || ½ || 0 || 1 || 1 || 1 || 1 || 5½ || 0 || ||
|-
| 4 || align="left" | || 2774 || ½ || ½ || 0 ||  || ½ || 1 || ½ || ½ || ½ || ½ || 4½ || 1½ || ||
|-
| 5 || align="left" | || 2745 || 0 || ½ || ½ || ½ ||  || ½ || 0 || ½ || 1 || 1 || 4½ || 1 || ||
|-
| 6 || align="left" | || 2609 || ½ || 0 || 1 || 0 || ½ ||  || 1 || 0 || ½ || 1 || 4½ || ½ || ||
|-
| 7 || align="left" | || 2756 || ½ || ½ || 0 || ½ || 1 || 0 ||  || ½ || 1 || 0 || 4 || ½ || 2 || 18.25
|-
| 8 || align="left" | || 2730 || ½ || 0 || 0 || ½ || ½ || 1 || ½ ||  || 0 || 1 || 4 || ½  || 2 || 17.00
|-
| 9 || align="left" | || 2786 || 0 || 1 || 0 || ½ || 0 || ½ || 0 || 1 ||  || ½ || 3½ ||  ||  ||
|-
| 10 || align="left"| || 2744 || ½ || ½ || 0 || ½ || 0 || 0 || 1 || 0 || ½ ||  || 3 || || ||
|}

{| class="wikitable" style="text-align: center;"
|+Saint Louis Grand Chess Tour Blitz, 15–16 August 2021, St. Louis, Missouri, United States
! !! Player !! Rating !! 1 !! 2 !! 3 !! 4 !! 5 !! 6 !! 7 !! 8 !! 9 !! 10 !! Points !!  !!  !! SB
|-
|-style="background:#ccffcc;"
| 1 || align=left| || 2900 || || 1 ½ || ½ ½ || ½ 1 || ½ ½ || ½ 1 || ½ ½ || 1 1 || ½ ½ || 1 ½ || 12 || || ||
|-
| 2 || align="left" | || 2690 || 0 ½ ||  || 1 0 || 0 0 || ½ ½ || ½ ½ || 1 1 || 1 1 || 1 1 || 1 1 || 11½ || ||||
|-
| 3 || align="left" | || 2654 || ½ ½ || 0 1 ||  || ½ 1 || ½ 0 || 1 0 || 0 1 || 1 ½ || ½ 1 || ½ ½ || 10 || 1½ || ||
|-
| 4 || align="left" | || 2734 || ½ 0 || 1 1 || ½ 0 ||  || 1 1 || 0 ½ || ½ ½ || 0 ½ || 0 1 || 1 1 || 10 || ½ || ||
|-
| 5 || align="left" | || 2861 || ½ ½ || ½ ½ || ½ 1 || 0 0 ||  || 1 0 || ½ ½ || 1 ½ || 1 ½ || 0 1 || 9½ || || ||
|-
| 6 || align="left" | || 2755 || ½ 0 || ½ ½ || 0 1 || 1 ½ || 0 1 ||  || ½ 0 || ½ 1 || 1 0 || 1 0 || 9 || || ||
|-
| 7 || align="left" | || 2776 || ½ ½ || 0 0 || 1 0 || ½ ½ || ½ ½ || ½ 1 ||  || 0 ½ || 0 1 || ½ 1 || 8½ || || ||
|-
| 8 || align="left" | || 2724 || 0 0 || 0 0 || 0 ½ || 1 0 || 0 ½ || ½ 0 || 1 ½ ||  || 1 ½ || 1 0 || 7 || 1½ || ||
|-
| 9 || align="left" | || 2743 || ½ ½ || 0 0 || ½ 0 || 1 0 || 0 ½ || 0 1 || 1 0 || 0 ½ ||  || ½ 1 || 7 || || ||
|-
| 10 || align="left" | || 2704 || 0 ½ || 0 0 || ½ ½ || 0 0 || 1 0 || 0 1 || ½ 0 || 0 1 || ½ 0 ||  || 5½ || || ||
|}

Final standings
{| class="wikitable" style="text-align: center;"
! !! Player !! Points(rapid score doubled)
|-
|-style="background:#ccffcc;"
| 1 || align="left" | || 24
|-
| 2 || align="left" | || 21
|-
| 3 || align="left" | || 19½
|-
| 4 || align="left" |  || 18½
|-
| 5 || align="left" | || 17½
|-
| T-6 || align="left" | || 17
|-
| T-6 || align="left" |  || 17
|-
| 8 || align="left" | || 16
|-
| 9 || align="left" | || 15
|-
| 10 || align="left" | || 14½
|}

Sinquefield Cup 
{| class="wikitable" style="text-align:center;"
|+ 8th Sinquefield Cup, 16-28 August St. Louis, Missouri, United States, Category XX (2742.0)
! !! Player !! Rating !! 1 !! 2 !! 3 !! 4 !! 5 !! 6 !! 7 !! 8 !! 9 !! 10 !! Points !!  !!  !! SB !! Koya !! TPR !! Tour Points
|-
|-style="background:#ccffcc;"
| 1 || align=left |  || 2751 ||   || ½ || 0 || ½ || ½ || 1 || 1 || ½ || 1 || 1 || 6 || || || || || 2919 || 13
|-
| 2 || align=left |  || 2806 || ½ ||  || ½ || ½ || ½ || 1 || 0 || 1 || ½ || 1 || 5½ || 1 || 3 || || || 2824 || 8.3
|-
| 3 || align=left |  || 2758 || 1 || ½ ||  || ½ || ½ || ½ || ½ || ½ || ½ || 1 || 5½ || 1 || 2 || 24.00 || || 2829 || 8.3
|-
| 4 || align=left |  || 2772 || ½ || ½ || ½ ||   || ½ || ½ || ½ || ½ || 1 || 1 || 5½ || 1 || 2 || 22.75 || || 2828 || 8.3
|-
| 5 || align=left |  || 2763 || ½ || ½ || ½ || ½ ||  || ½ || ½ || 0 || 1 || ½ || 4½ ||  || || || || 2740 || 6
|-
| 6 || align=left |  || 2709 || 0 || 0 || ½ || ½ || ½ ||   || ½ || 1 || ½ || ½ || 4 || 1½ || || || || 2701 || 4
|-
| 7 || align=left |  || 2710 || 0 || 1 || ½ || ½ || ½ || ½ ||  || ½ || ½ || 0 || 4 || 1 || || || || 2701 || 4
|-
| 8 || align=left |  || 2782 || ½ || 0 || ½ || ½ || 1 || 0 || ½ ||  || ½ || ½ || 4 || ½ || || || || 2693 || 4
|-
| 9 || align=left |  || 2714 || 0 || ½ || ½ || 0 || 0 || ½ || ½ ||  ½||  || 1 || 3½ || || || || || 2656 || 2
|-
| 10 || align=left |  || 2655 || 0 || 0 || 0 || 0 || ½ || ½ || 1 || ½ || 0 ||  || 2½ || || || || || 2574 || 1
|}

Tour Standings 
The wildcards (in italics) are not counted in overall standings.

Notes

References 

Grand Chess Tour
Chess competitions
2021 in chess